Jeanne Arth and Darlene Hard were the defending champions, but Arth did not compete. Hard partnered with Maria Bueno, and they defeated Sandra Reynolds and Renée Schuurman in the final, 6–4, 6–0 to win the ladies' doubles tennis title at the 1960 Wimbledon Championships.

Seeds

  Maria Bueno /  Darlene Hard (champions)
  Margaret Hellyer /  Yola Ramírez (quarterfinals)
  Karen Hantze /  Janet Hopps (semifinals)
  Sandra Reynolds /  Renée Schuurman (final)

Draw

Finals

Top half

Section 1

Section 2

Bottom half

Section 3

Section 4

References

External links

Women's Doubles
Wimbledon Championship by year – Women's doubles
Wimbledon Championships
Wimbledon Championships